In 2005 the Shooto Organization decided to create splinter Shooto organizations around the world, with their own rankings and champions. Along with a European and American Shooto organization, a Pacific Rim organization was created focusing on Asia (but mostly Japan). This is the title history for the Pacific Rim titles.

Title histories

Middleweight Championship
Weight limit: 77 kg (154.3 lb)

Welterweight Championship
Weight limit: 70 kg (154.3 lb)

Lightweight Championship 
136 to 145 lbs

Featherweight Championship 
126 to 135 lbs

See also
 Shooto
 List of Shooto champions

References 

Shooto
Mixed martial arts champions
Shooto Champions, List Of